The 2022 Youth European Boxing Championships, the 32nd European Boxing Championships for youths aged 17 to 19, took place in Sofia, Bulgaria, from 14 to 21 April 2022. The event was organized by the European Boxing Confederation (EUBC). To participate, boxers must have been born in 2004 or 2005.

Medals

Men's

Women's

Medalists

Schedule 
Source:

Participating countries 
A total of 377 boxers from the national teams of the following 40 countries was registered to compete at 2022 Youth European Boxing Championships.

Russia and Belarus banned from attending all international competitions due to the 2022 Russian invasion of Ukraine.

  (1)
  (13)
  (13)
  (2)
  (6)
  (18)
  (5)
  (9)
  (4)
  (16)
  (5)
  (6)
  (6)
  (13)
  (20)
  (8)
  (17)
  (24)
  (7)
  (16)
  (4)
  (7)
  (5)
  (13)
  (3)
  (1)
  (2)
  (5)
  (18)
  (19)
  (3)
  (9)
  (6)
  (2)
  (10)
  (7)
  (2)
  (25)
  (25)
  (2)

Draw sheets

Men's Minimumweight (M48 kg)

Men's Flyweight (M51 kg)

Men's Bantamweight (M54 kg)

Men's Featherweight (M57 kg)

Men's Lightweight (M60 kg)

Men's Light Welterweight (M63.5 kg)

Men's Welterweight (M67 kg)

Men's Light Middleweight (M71 kg)

Men's Middleweight (M75 kg)

Men's Light Heavyweight (M80 kg)

Men's Cruiserweight (M86 kg)

Men's Heavyweight (M92 kg)

Men's Super Heavyweight (M+92 kg)

Women's Minimumweight (W48 kg)

Women's Light Flyweight (W50 kg)

Women's Flyweight (W52 kg)

Women's Bantamweight (W54 kg)

Women's Featherweight (W57 kg)

Women's Lightweight (W60 kg)

Women's Light Welterweight (W63 kg)

Women's Welterweight (W66 kg)

Women's Light Middleweight (W70 kg)

Women's Middleweight (W75 kg)

Women's Light Heavyweight (W81 kg)

Women's Heavyweight (W+81 kg)

External links 
 EUBC Youth Men's and Women's European Boxing Championships

References 

European Youth Boxing Championships
European Amateur Boxing Championships
European Boxing Championships
Sports competitions in Sofia
European Boxing Championships
European Boxing Championships